Radda in Chianti is a comune (municipality) in the Province of Siena in the Italian region Tuscany, located about  southeast of Florence and about  north of Siena.

Radda in Chianti borders the following municipalities: Castellina in Chianti, Castelnuovo Berardenga, Cavriglia, Gaiole in Chianti, Greve in Chianti.

Twin towns
 Saint Brice, France

See also
History of Chianti

References

External links

Chianti Storico site (Tourist Information Office)